Twilight, originally published in 1988 in French as Le crépuscule, au loin, is a novel by Elie Wiesel. Twilight is the fictional story of a Holocaust survivor named Raphael Lipkin who is now a psychologist living in the United States of America. He visits a psychiatric ward called "The Mountain Clinic," where he interviews several psychiatric patients who believe themselves to be various characters from the Old Testament. Interwoven with these accounts are Raphael's own memories of his life before and during the Holocaust.

References

1988 American novels
Novels about the aftermath of the Holocaust
Personal accounts of the Holocaust
Novels by Elie Wiesel